William Tanner (11 April 1841 – unknown) was an English first-class cricketer active 1863–68 who played for Surrey. He was born in Weybridge.

References

1841 births
English cricketers
Surrey cricketers
Year of death missing
Players of Surrey cricketers